Alfred Macyk (March 2, 1924 – May 1, 2018) was a provincial politician from Alberta, Canada. He served as a member of the Legislative Assembly of Alberta from 1955 to 1959 sitting with the Liberal caucus in opposition.

Political career
Macyk ran for a seat to the Alberta Legislature as a Liberal candidate in the electoral district of Redwater in the 1955 Alberta general election. He defeated incumbent MLA Peter Chaba on the third vote count to win the four way race and pickup the seat for his party.

Macyk ran for a second term in office in the 1959 Alberta general election. He was handily defeated by Social Credit candidate John Dubetz finishing second ahead of Progressive Conservative candidate Martha Bielish in the three way race. He died on May 1, 2018.

References

External links
Legislative Assembly of Alberta Members Listing

Alberta Liberal Party MLAs
1924 births
2018 deaths